1994–95 Ukrainian First League was the fourth season of the Ukrainian First League which was won by Zirka-NIBAS Kirovohrad. The season started on August 6, 1994, and finished on July 2, 1995. In the last round the Kyiv club was only a point away and was visiting Oleksandriya, while the leading Zirka was hosting the former Premier League participant Bukovyna. The Kirovohrad club has managed to prevail with goals from Borysenko and Oliynyk becoming the season champions.

Promotion and relegation

Promoted teams
Four clubs promoted from the 1993–94 Ukrainian Second League.
 FC Boryspil – champion (debut)
 FC Bazhanovets Makaiivka – 2nd place (debut)
 FC Zirka-NIBAS Kirovohrad – 3rd place (debut)
 FC Naftokhimik Kremenchuk – 4th place (debut)

Relegated teams 
Two clubs were relegated from the 1993-94 Ukrainian Top League:
 FC Bukovyna Chernivtsi – 17th place (debut)
 FC Metalist Kharkiv – 18th place (debut)

Renamed teams
 FC Nord-Am-Podillya Khmelnytskyi was renamed back to FC Podillya Khmelnytskyi at the start of season
 FC Boryspil was renamed to FC Borysfen Boryspil at the start of season
 FC SBTS Sumy was renamed to FC Sumy at winter break
 FC Borysfen Boryspil was renamed to FC CSKA-Borysfen Kyiv at winter break

Teams
In 1994-95 season, the Ukrainian First League consists of the following teams:

Final table

Top scorers 
Statistics are taken from here.

See also
 1994–95 Ukrainian Premier League
 1994–95 Ukrainian Second League
 1994–95 Ukrainian Third League
 1994–95 Ukrainian Cup
 1994–95 Ukrainian Football Amateur League

References 

Ukrainian First League seasons
2
Ukra